Aromadendrin (aromodendrin or dihydrokaempferol) is a flavanonol, a type of flavonoid. It can be found in the wood of Pinus sibirica.

Metabolism
The enzyme dihydrokaempferol 4-reductase uses cis-3,4-leucopelargonidin and NADP+ to  produce (+)-aromadendrin, NADPH, and H+.

Glycosides
(2R,3R)-trans-Aromadendrin-7-O-beta-D-glucopyranoside-6-(4-hydroxy-2-methylene butanoate) is an acylated glucoside of aromadendrin isolated from the stem bark of Afzelia bella (Fabaceae).

Phellamurin is the 8-prenyl 7-glucoside derivative of aromadendrin.

Chemistry
(+)-Leucopelargonidin, (2R,3S,4R)-3,4,5,7,4'-pentahydroxyflavan, can be synthesized from (+)-aromadendrin by sodium borohydride reduction.

References

External links

Flavanonols
Resorcinols